The Faulkton American Legion Hall, also known as Faulkton Community Hall, was built in 1924.  It was listed on the National Register of Historic Places in 2005.  It reflects Late 19th and Early 20th Century American Movements architecture and Commercial Style architecture, and served historically as a meeting hall.

References

American Legion buildings
Commercial Style architecture in the United States
Clubhouses on the National Register of Historic Places in South Dakota
National Register of Historic Places in Faulk County, South Dakota
Buildings and structures completed in 1924
1924 establishments in South Dakota